The HBV hydrology model, or Hydrologiska Byråns Vattenbalansavdelning model, is a computer simulation used to analyze river discharge and water pollution.  Developed originally for use in Scandinavia, this hydrological transport model has also been applied in a large number of catchments on most continents.

Discharge modelling
This is the major application of HBV, and has gone through much refinement. It comprises the following routines:
 Snow routine
 Soil moisture routine
 Response function
 Routing routine
The HBV model is a lumped (or semi-distributed) bucket-type (or also called 'conceptual') catchment model that has relatively few model parameters and minimal forcing input requirements, usually the daily temperature and the daily precipitation.
First the snow is calculated after defining a threshold melting temperature (TT usually 0 °C) and a parameter CMELT that reflects the equivalent melted snow for the difference of temperature. The result is divided into a liquid part that is the surface runoff and a second part that infiltrates.
Second the soil moisture is calculated after defining an initial value and the field capacity (FC). 
Third calculation of the actual Evapotranspiration (ETPa), first by using an external model (ex: Penman) for finding the potential ETP and then fitting the result to the temperatures and the permanent wilting point(PWP) of the catchment in question. A parameter C which reflects the increase in the ETP with the differences in temperatures ( Actual Temperature and Monthly mean Temperature).
The model considers the catchment as two reservoirs (S1 and S2) connected by a percolation flow, the inflow to the first reservoir is calculated as the surface runoff, which is what remains from the initial precipitations after calculating the infiltration and the evapotranspiration.
The outflow from the first reservoir is divided into two separate flows (Q1 and Q2) where Q1 represents the fast flow which is triggered after a certain threshold L to be defined by the user and Q2 the intermediate flow. A constant K1 is used to find the outflows as a function of the storage in S1.
To consider the percolation rate a constant Kd is used as along as the storage is S1.
The outflow from the second reservoir is considered to be the groundwater flow (Q3) function of a constant K2 and the storage in S2.
The total flow generated from a certain rain event is the sum of the 3 flows.
The result of the model are later compared to the actual measured flow values and Nasch parameter is used to calibrate the model by changing the different parameters. The model has in total 9 parameters : TT, Cmelt, FC, C, PWP, L, K1, K2, Kd. For a good calibration of the model it is better to use Monte-Carlo simulation or the GLUE-Method to properly define the parameters and the uncertainty in the model.
The model is fairly reliable but as usual the need of good input data is essential for good results.  The sensitivity of the HBV model to parameter uncertainty was explored  revealing significant parameter interactions affecting calibration uniqueness, and some state dependence.
HBV has been used for discharge modelling in many countries worldwide, including Brazil, China, Iran, Mozambique, Sweden, Switzerland and Zimbabwe. The HBV has also been used to simulate internal variables such as groundwater levels. The model has also been used for hydrological change detection studies and climate-change impact studies.

The HBV model exists in several versions. One version, which has been especially designed for education with a user-friendly graphical user interface, is HBV light.

HBV emulation is available as a part of Raven hydrologic framework. Raven is an open-source robust and flexible hydrological modelling framework, designed for application to challenging hydrological problems in academia and practice. This fully object-oriented code provides complete flexibility in spatial discretization, interpolation, process representation, and forcing function generation.

Sediment and solute modelling
The HBV model can also simulate the riverine transport of sediment and dissolved solids. Lidén simulated the transport of nitrogen, phosphorus and suspended sediment in Brazil, Estonia, Sweden and Zimbabwe.

See also

Hydrological transport model
Runoff model

References

External links
 The HBV model at the Swedish Department of Climate (SMHI)
 HBV light at the University of Zurich 
 HBV Matlab Code (lumped version)
 HBV-EC pre- and post-processor "Green Kenue" free download at the Canadian Hydraulics Centre
 HBV program in RS MINERVE at the CREALP (lumped version)

Computer-aided engineering software
Hydrology models